is a JR West Geibi Line station located in 5-chōme, Fukawa, Asakita-ku, Hiroshima, Hiroshima Prefecture, Japan. This is the largest of the three Fukawa stations on the Geibi Line, and handles many trains daily.

History
The current station building was built sometime during the Japanese National Railways era. An automatic ticket gate was installed in 2007.
 April 28, 1915: Shimofukawa Station opens
 April 1, 1987: Japanese National Railways is privatized, and Shimofukawa Station becomes a JR West station

Station building and platforms
Shimofukawa Station features one island-style platform capable of handling two lines simultaneously. The platform is located inside an old canal, with the station building located above the tracks on the north bank, overlooking the tracks and the enclosed footbridge which passes overhead the tracks. Shimofukawa Station is operated privately under contract with JR West. The station features a Green Window.

Environs
Seizan Park (西山公園)
Terasaku Park (寺迫公園)
Asakita-ku Sports Center
JR West Kabe Line Nakashima Station (1.5 km northwest)
JR West Kabe Line Kamiyagi Station (2 km west)
Hiroshima Municipal Kamezaki Elementary School
Hiroshima Municipal Magame Elementary School
Hiroshima Municipal Kamezaki Junior High School
Hiroshima Municipal Ochiai Junior High School
Misasa River (三篠川)
Ōta River (太田川)
Namcoland

Highway access
Japan National Route 54
 Hiroshima Prefectural Route 37 (Hiroshima-Miyoshi Route)
 Hiroshima Prefectural Route 70 (Hiroshima-Nakashima Route)
 Hiroshima Prefectural Route 177 (Shimosa Higashi Route)
 Hiroshima Prefectural Route 240 (Kabe Teishajō Route)
 Hiroshima Prefectural Route 270 (Yagi-Midorii Route)

Connecting lines
All lines are JR West lines. 
Geibi Line
Miyoshi Express (#1, 2, 5, 6, 7, 8)
No stop
Miyoshi Express (#3, 4)
Shiwaguchi Station — Shimofukawa Station — Akiyaguchi Station
Commuter Liner
Karuga Station — Shimofukawa Station — Hiroshima Station
Miyoshi Liner/Local
Nakafukawa Station — Shimofukawa Station — Kumura Station

External links
 JR West

Railway stations in Hiroshima Prefecture
Geibi Line
Hiroshima City Network
Stations of West Japan Railway Company in Hiroshima city
Railway stations in Japan opened in 1915